"Richer" is a song by American rapper Rod Wave, released on March 26, 2021, as the third single of his third studio album SoulFly, which was released on the same day. The song features American rapper Polo G and was produced by Pluto Brazy and Flynn.

Composition
The track uses a country-influenced trap production, with guitar as well as "heavy bass drum and mid-tempo 808s". The rappers sing about their respective upbringings and rises to stardom, and celebrate their fame. In the chorus, Rod Wave croons, "I'm richer than I've ever been".

Charts

References

2021 singles
2021 songs
Polo G songs
Rod Wave songs
Songs written by Polo G
Trap music songs
Songs written by Rod Wave